"Abracadabra" (Hangul: 아브라카다브라) is a song recorded by South Korean girl group Brown Eyed Girls. Released as the second single from Sound-G in July 2009, it marked a change in the group's image and style.  The song topped various on- and offline charts, including a 3-week chart-topping run on music portal M.Net.

History
The song lyrics is written by Kim Eana (김이나), while Miryo wrote the rap lyrics. It is composed by a hit-songwriter Lee Min-soo (이민수) and hit-maker and DJ Hitchhiker.

Due to the various girl groups that debuted and succeeded in 2009, the Brown Eyed Girls felt that having a cute and innocent concept would work against them; as such, they came back as "sexy bad girls".

Promotion
The group returned to the various network music shows at the end of July, continuing the mature concept.

Lyrics
The song was originally titled "Voodoo". The lyric is about a blind love, and especially the phrase, 'a doll resembling you' implies a ritual popularly associated with the religion. However, as the title mentioning the specific religion was caught up by the censorship, it was replaced with the current title meaning a conjuration.

Charts and performance
The song was released to various digital outlets in July 2009, after which it quickly topped various online charts.  The song also won the "Mutizen Song" award on SBS's Inkigayo music program. The song also won a Best Dance & Electronic Song at the 2010 Korean Music Awards.

Music video

The 4-minute-long music video was directed by Hwang Sua, who had studied Film at New York University and established a career as a music video and commercial director. The video was praised for its sensational and intense presentation but also garnered controversies regarding its sensual contexts. In a 2009 interview, Hwang said she wanted to express the feelings of the subject in the song going back and forth between reason and emotion in a modern and fashionable choreography since the main theme is a curse and blind love. She divided the video into two settings; performing scenes of the band and narrative drama scenes. The former are in a white background with toned-down saturation to prevent other narrative stories from conflicting the latter, and to represent an infinite space.

Teasers for the music video were released in mid-July 2009, hinting at a possible kiss scene between members Ga-in and Narsha.  After its full release, netizens posted critical remarks of the video due to its suggestive content.  However, the "Saucy" dance (called Sigeonbang chum in Korean), showing the members moving their hips left and right, became a popular dance.

Various news agencies reported that member Ga-in watched pornography in order to prepare for the video's dance sequences.  However, on the August 29 broadcast of Star Golden Bell, Ga-in clarified the misunderstanding, stating that she watched sensual movies, namely 9½ Weeks.

In popular culture 
In August 2009, a parody video was done by members of boy bands 'One Day' (a collective name of 2AM and 2PM), appeared there as "Dirty Eyed Girls" (드러운 아이드 걸스) in an episode of 2PM's reality show Wild Bunny; the Brown Eyed Girls said that they were thankful in response, as it showcased the video's popularity. Psy used the "Abracadabra" dance in his music video for "Gentleman", which also featured BEG's own Ga-in.

Accolades

Music show wins

References

External links
 Official fansite 

2009 singles
Brown Eyed Girls songs
Korean-language songs
2009 songs
Songs with lyrics by Kim Eana